The 55th Legislature of the National Congress was a meeting of the legislative branch of the Brazilian federal government, consisting of the Chamber of Deputies and the Federal Senate. It met in Brasília from February, 1 2015 to January, 31 2019. All members of the Chamber of Deputies and one-third of the Senate were elected in the elections of 5 October 2014.

Party summary

Reception
According to the political analyst of the Inter-Union Department of Parliamentary Advice, Antônio Augusto de Queiroz, the National Congress elected in 2014 may be considered the most conservative since the "re-democratization" movement, noting an increase in the number of parliamentarians linked to more conservative segments, such as ruralists, military, police and the religious.

Leadership

Federal Senate 
 President of the Federal Senate: Renan Calheiros (PMDB-AL), until 1 February 2017
 Eunício Oliveira (PMDB-CE), from 1 February 2017

Government Bloc Leadership 
 Government Leader: Romero Jucá (MDB-RR)
 MDB Leader: Simone Tebet (MS)
 PP Leader: Ana Amélia (RS)
 DEM Leader: Ronaldo Caiado (GO)
 PR Leader: Vicentinho Alves (TO)
 PSD Leader: Omar Aziz (AM)
 PRB Leader: Eduardo Lopes (RJ)
 PTB Leader: Armando Monteiro (PE)
 PPS Leader: Cristovam Buarque (DF)

Opposition Bloc Leadership 
 Opposition Leader: Humberto Costa (PT-PE)
 PT Leader: Lindbergh Farias (RJ)
 PSB Leader: Antonio Carlos Valadares (SE)
 PDT Leader: Acir Gurgacz (RO)
 PCdoB Leader: Vanessa Grazziotin (AM)
 REDE Leader: Randolfe Rodrigues (AP)

Independent Bloc Leadership 
 PSDB Leader: Paulo Bauer (SC)
 PODE Leader: Alvaro Dias (PR)
 PROS Leader: Hélio José (DF)
 PTC Leader: Fernando Collor (AL)

Chamber of Deputies 
 President of the Chamber of Deputies: Eduardo Cunha (PMDB-RJ), until 7 July 2016
 Rodrigo Maia (DEM-RJ), from 14 July 2016

Government Bloc Leadership 
 Government Leader: Aguinaldo Ribeiro (PP-PB)
 Majority Leader: Lelo Coimbra (MDB-ES)
 MDB Leader: Baleia Rossi (SP)
 PP Leader: Arthur Lira (AL)
 DEM Leader: Rodrigo Garcia (SP)
 PR Leader: José Rocha (BA)
 PSD Leader: Domingos Neto (CE)
 PRB Leader: Celso Russomanno (SP)
 PTB Leader: Jovair Arantes (GO)
 SD Leader: Wladimir Costa (PA)
 PSC Leader: Gilberto Nascimento (SP)
 PPS Leader: Alex Manente (SP)
 PATRI Leader: Junior Marreca (MA)

Opposition Bloc Leadership 
 Opposition Leader: José Guimarães (PT-CE)
 Minority Leader: Weverton Rocha (PDT-MA)
 PT Leader: Paulo Pimenta (RS)
 PSB Leader: Tadeu Alencar (CE)
 PDT Leader: André Figueiredo (CE)
 PCdoB Leader: Orlando Silva (SP)
 PSOL Leader: Chico Alencar (RJ)
 REDE Leader: João Derly (RS)
 PPL Representative: Uldurico Junior (BA)

Independent Bloc Leadership 
 PSDB Leader: Nilson Leitão (MT)
 PODE Leader: Diego Garcia (PR)
 PROS Leader: Felipe Bornier (RJ)
 PSL Leader: Fernando Francischini (PR)
 AVANTE Leader: Luis Tibé (MG)
 PV Leader: Leandre Dal Ponte (PR)
 PHS Leader: Marcelo Aro (MG)

Federal Senate 

The Senate represents the 26 states and the Federal District. Each state and the Federal District has a representation of three Senators, who are elected by popular ballot for a term of eight years. Every four years, renewal of either one third or two-thirds of the Senate (and of the delegations of the States and the Federal District) takes place. In 5 October 2014 elections, one-third (1 senator for each state) of the Federal Senate were elected.

Senators by state 

Acre

Alagoas

Amapá

Amazonas

Bahia

 Walter Pinheiro replaced by Roberto Muniz since 6 June 2016.

Ceará

Distrito Federal

 Rodrigo Rollemberg replaced by Hélio José since 1 January 2015.

Espírito Santo

 Ricardo Ferraço replaced by Sérgio de Castro since 6 November 2017.

Goiás

 Demóstenes Torres was expelled on 11 July 2012; Wilder Morais replaced him since 13 July 2012.

Maranhão

Mato Grosso

 Pedro Taques replaced by José Medeiros since 1 January 2015.
 Blairo Maggi replaced by Cidinho Santos since 15 May 2016.

Mato Grosso do Sul

 Delcídio do Amaral was expelled on 10 May 2016; Pedro Chaves replaced him since 16 May 2016.

Minas Gerais

 Itamar Franco died on 2 July 2011, Zezé Perrella replaced him since 11 July 2011.

Pará

 Jader Barbalho won an appeal in the Supreme Federal Court and took office on 28 December 2011, replacing Marinor Brito.

Paraíba

 Cássio Cunha Lima won an appeal in the Supreme Federal Court and took office on 8 November 2011, replacing Wilson Santiago.
 Vital do Rêgo Filho replaced by Raimundo Lira since 22 December 2014.

Paraná

 Gleisi Hoffmann licensed between 8 June 2011 and 3 February 2014, Sérgio de Souza replaced her during this period.

Pernambuco

Piauí

 Wellington Dias replaced by Regina Sousa since 1 January 2015.

Rio de Janeiro

 Marcelo Crivella replaced by Eduardo Lopes since 2 January 2017.

Rio Grande do Norte

Rio Grande do Sul

Rondônia

Roraima

Santa Catarina

 Luiz Henrique died on 10 May 2015; Dalírio Beber replaced him since 19 May 2017.

São Paulo

 Aloysio Nunes replaced by Airton Sandoval since 9 March 2017.

Sergipe

Tocantins

 João Ribeiro died on 18 December 2013, Ataídes Oliveira replaced him since 23 December 2013.

Chamber of Deputies 

The Chamber comprises 513 deputies, who are elected by proportional representation to serve four-year terms. In 2014 elections, 198 (38.6%) of the elected candidates are new to the Chamber of Deputies, the highest rate of newcomers in 16 years. The number of parliamentary represented parties has also increased: from 22 parties after the 2010 election to 28 at the beginning of the new term.

Federal deputies by State 

Acre (8 federal deputies)

Alagoas (9 federal deputies)

Amapá (8 federal deputies)

Amazonas (8 federal deputies)

Bahia (39 federal deputies)

Ceará (22 federal deputies)

Distrito Federal (8 federal deputies)

Espírito Santo (10 federal deputies)

Goiás (17 federal deputies)

Maranhão (18 federal deputies)

Mato Grosso (8 federal deputies)

Mato Grosso do Sul (8 federal deputies)

Minas Gerais (53 federal deputies)

Pará (17 federal deputies)

Paraíba (12 federal deputies)

Paraná (30 federal deputies)

Pernambuco (25 federal deputies)

Piauí (10 federal deputies)

Rio de Janeiro (46 federal deputies)

Rio Grande do Norte (8 federal deputies)

Rio Grande do Sul (31 federal deputies)

Rondônia (8 federal deputies)

Roraima (8 federal deputies)

Santa Catarina (16 federal deputies)

São Paulo (70 federal deputies)

Sergipe (8 federal deputies)

Tocantins (8 federal deputies)

See also
Federal government of Brazil
National Congress of Brazil
Federal Senate
Chamber of Deputies
Evangelical Caucus (pt)

References

Legislative branch of Brazil